Khabary is a rural locality (a selo) and the administrative center of Khabarsky District of Altai Krai, Russia. Population:  As of 2016, population was 5,141 in 2016.

Geography 

References

Notes

Sources

Rural localities in Khabarsky District